Kill Bill: Volume 2 is a 2004 American neo-Western martial arts film written and directed by Quentin Tarantino. It is the sequel to Kill Bill: Volume 1, and stars Uma Thurman as the Bride, who continues her campaign of revenge against the Deadly Viper Assassination Squad (Lucy Liu, Michael Madsen, Daryl Hannah, and Vivica A. Fox) and their leader Bill (David Carradine), who tried to kill her and her unborn child.

Volume 2 is the second of two Kill Bill films produced simultaneously; the first, Volume 1, was released six months earlier. They were originally set for a single release, but the film, with a runtime of over four hours, was divided in two. Tarantino conceived Kill Bill as an homage to grindhouse cinema including martial arts films, samurai cinema, blaxploitation, and spaghetti westerns. Like its predecessor, Volume 2 received positive reviews. It grossed $152.2 million worldwide on a production budget of $30 million.

Plot
The pregnant Bride and her groom rehearse their wedding. Bill − the Bride's former lover, the father of her child, and the leader of the Deadly Viper Assassination Squad − arrives unexpectedly and orders the Deadly Vipers to kill everyone at the wedding rehearsal. Bill shoots the Bride in the head, but she survives and swears revenge.

Four years later, the Bride, having already assassinated Deadly Vipers O-Ren Ishii and Vernita Green, goes to the trailer of Bill's brother and Deadly Viper Budd, planning to ambush him. Having been warned by Bill beforehand, he incapacitates her with a non-lethal shotgun blast of rock salt and sedates her. He calls Elle Driver, another former Deadly Viper, and arranges to sell her the Bride's unique sword for $1 million. He seals the Bride inside a coffin and buries her alive.

Years earlier, Bill tells the young Bride of the legendary martial arts master Pai Mei and his Five Point Palm Exploding Heart Technique, a death blow that Pai refuses to teach his students; properly used, the attack is reputed to leave an opponent able to take only five steps before dying. Bill takes the Bride to Pai's temple for training. Pai ridicules and torments her during training, but she eventually gains his respect. In the present, the Bride uses Pai's techniques to escape from the coffin and claw her way to the surface.

Elle arrives at Budd's trailer and kills him with a black mamba hidden within the money for the sword. She calls Bill and tells him that the Bride has killed Budd and that she has killed the Bride, using the Bride's real name: Beatrix Kiddo. As Elle exits the trailer, Beatrix ambushes her and they fight. Elle, who was also taught by Pai, taunts Beatrix by revealing that she killed Pai by poisoning his favorite meal in retribution for him plucking out her eye after she called him "a miserable old fool". Enraged, Beatrix plucks out Elle's remaining eye and leaves her screaming in the trailer with the black mamba.

In Acuña, Mexico, Beatrix meets a retired pimp, Esteban Vihaio, who helps her find Bill. She tracks him to a hotel, and discovers that their daughter B.B. is still alive, now four years old. Beatrix spends the evening with them. After she puts B.B. to bed, Bill shoots Beatrix with a dart containing truth serum and interrogates her. She explains that she left the Deadly Vipers when she discovered she was pregnant to give B.B. a better life. Bill explains that he assumed she was dead; he ordered her assassination when he discovered she was alive and engaged to a "jerk" he assumed was the father of her child. The two begin to fight, but Beatrix traps Bill's sword in her scabbard and strikes him with the Five Point Palm Exploding Heart Technique. Surprised that Pai taught her the attack, Bill reconciles with her, then falls dead as he walks away. Beatrix leaves with B.B. to start a new life.

Cast
 Uma Thurman as The Bride / Beatrix Kiddo (Black Mamba): A former member of the Deadly Viper Assassination Squad who is described as "the deadliest woman in the world". She is targeted by her former allies in the wedding chapel massacre, and falls into a coma. When she awakens four years later, she embarks on a deadly trail of revenge against the perpetrators of the massacre.
 David Carradine as Bill (Snake Charmer): The former leader of the Deadly Viper Assassination Squad. He is also the former lover of Beatrix and the father of her daughter. He is the final target of Beatrix's revenge.
 Michael Madsen as Budd (Sidewinder): A former member of the Deadly Viper Assassination Squad and brother of Bill. He later becomes a bouncer living in a trailer. He is the third of Beatrix's revenge targets.
 Daryl Hannah as Elle Driver (California Mountain Snake): A former member of the Deadly Viper Assassination Squad. She is the fourth of Beatrix's revenge targets. Driver is based on Madeleine (Christina Lindberg) in They Call Her One Eye.
 Gordon Liu as : An immensely powerful and extremely old martial arts master. Beatrix, Bill, and Elle all train under him. Liu had appeared in Volume 1 as Johnny Mo, leader of the Yakuza gang The Crazy 88's.
 Michael Parks as : A retired pimp. He was the first of Bill's “father figures”. Beatrix comes to him asking for Bill's whereabouts. Like Gordon Liu, Parks appeared in the first film as a different character, Texas Ranger Earl McGraw.
 Stephanie L. Moore, Shana Stein, and Caitlin Keats as Joleen, Erica, and Janeen: Beatrix's best friends who are present at the wedding rehearsal.
 Bo Svenson as Reverend Harmony: The minister who was to officiate at Beatrix and Tommy's wedding.
 Jeannie Epper as Mrs. Harmony: Reverend Harmony's wife.
 Chris Nelson as Tommy Plympton: Beatrix's fiancé who is killed in the wedding chapel massacre.
 Samuel L. Jackson as : The organist who was to perform at Beatrix and Tommy's wedding.
 Larry Bishop as Larry Gomez: The abusive manager of the strip club at which Budd works.
 Sid Haig as Jay: An employee at the strip club where Budd works.
 Laura Cayouette as Rocket: A stripper who works at the strip club where Budd works.
 Clark Middleton as Ernie: A friend of Budd’s who helps him bury Beatrix alive.
 Perla Haney-Jardine as : The daughter of Beatrix and Bill. She is raised by her father while her mother is comatose.
 Lawrence Bender as Hotel Worker (Uncredited cameo)
 Helen Kim as : An assassin sent to kill Beatrix. Her attack comes moments after Beatrix learns that she is pregnant.
 Lucy Liu as O-Ren Ishii (Cottonmouth): A former member of the Deadly Viper Assassination Squad. She later becomes "Queen of the Tokyo Underworld". She is the first of Beatrix's revenge targets.
 Vivica A. Fox as Vernita Green (Copperhead): A former member of the Deadly Viper Assassination Squad. She later becomes a homemaker living under the false name Jeannie Bell. She is the second of Beatrix's revenge targets.
 Julie Dreyfus as Sofie Fatale: O-Ren's lawyer, best friend, and second lieutenant. She is also a former protégé of Bill's, and was present at the wedding chapel massacre.
 Sonny Chiba as Hattori Hanzo: Revered as the greatest swordsmith of all time. Although long retired, he agrees to craft a sword for Beatrix.

Production 

Kill Bill Volume 1 and Volume 2 were planned and produced as a single film. After editing began, producer Harvey Weinstein, who was known for pressuring filmmakers to shorten their films, suggested that Tarantino split the film in two. The decision was announced in July 2003.

Music 

As with Tarantino's previous films, Kill Bill features an eclectic soundtrack comprising many musical genres. On the two soundtracks, music ranges from country music to selections from the Spaghetti Western film scores of Ennio Morricone. Bernard Herrmann's theme from the film Twisted Nerve is whistled by the menacing Elle Driver in the hospital scene. A brief, 15-second excerpt from the opening of the Ironside theme music by Quincy Jones is used as the Bride's revenge motif, which flares up with a red-tinged flashback whenever she is in the company of her next target. Instrumental tracks from Japanese guitarist Tomoyasu Hotei figure prominently, and after the success of Kill Bill they were frequently used in American TV commercials and at sporting events. The end credits are driven by the rock and roll version of "Malagueña Salerosa", a traditional Mexican song, performed by "Chingon", Robert Rodriguez's band.

Release

Theatrical release 

Variety posited that the delay was to coincide its theatrical release with Volume 1s release on DVD. Volume 2s opening weekend gross was higher than Volume 1s, and the equivalent success confirmed the studio's financial decision to split the film into two theatrical releases.

Volume 2 attracted more female theatergoers than Volume 1, with 60% of the audience being male and 56% of the audience being men between the ages of 18 to 29 years old. Volume 2s opening weekend was the largest to date for Miramax Films aside from releases under its arm Dimension Films. The opening weekend was also the largest to date in the month of April for a film restricted in the United States to theatergoers 17 years old and up, besting Lifes 1999 record. Volume 2s opening weekend was strengthened by the reception of Volume 1 in the previous year among audiences and critics, abundant publicity related to the splitting into two volumes, and the DVD release of Volume 1 in the week before Volume 2s theatrical release.

It grossed an estimated  and ranked first at the international box office, ending an eight-week streak held by The Passion of the Christ.

Home media

In the United States, Volume 2 was released on DVD and VHS on August 10, 2004.

In a December 2005 interview, Tarantino addressed the lack of a special edition DVD for Kill Bill by stating "I've been holding off because I've been working on it for so long that I just wanted a year off from Kill Bill and then I'll do the big supplementary DVD package."

The United States does not have a DVD boxed set of Kill Bill, though box sets of the two separate volumes are available in other countries, such as France, Japan and the United Kingdom. Upon the DVD release of Volume 2 in the US, however, Best Buy did offer an exclusive box set slipcase to house the two individual releases together.

Both Volume 1 and Volume 2, were released in High Definition on Blu-ray on September 9, 2008 in the United States.

The Whole Bloody Affair 
At the 2008 Provincetown International Film Festival, Tarantino announced that the original cut of Kill Bill, incorporating both films and an extended animation sequence, would be released in May 2009 as Kill Bill: The Whole Bloody Affair. Screenings began on March 27, 2011 at the New Beverly Cinema.

Reception 
On review aggregator Rotten Tomatoes, Kill Bill: Volume 2 holds an approval rating of 84% based on 244 reviews, with an average rating of 7.80/10. The website's critical consensus states, "Kill Bill: Volume 2 adds extra plot and dialogue to the action-heavy exploits of its predecessor, while still managing to deliver a suitably hard-hitting sequel." At Metacritic, which assigns a weighted average score to reviews from mainstream critics, the film received an average score of 83 out of 100 based on 41 reviews, indicating "universal acclaim". Audiences polled by CinemaScore gave the film an average grade of "A−" on an A+ to F scale, a grade up from the "B+" earned by the previous film.

Roger Ebert gave the film 4 stars out of 4, writing: "Put the two parts together, and Tarantino has made a masterful saga that celebrates the martial arts genre while kidding it, loving it, and transcending it. ... This is all one film, and now that we see it whole, it's greater than its two parts." In 2009, he named Kill Bill one of the 20 best films of the decade.

Accolades 
Uma Thurman received a Golden Globe Best Actress in a Motion Picture - Drama nomination in 2005 for her role. David Carradine also received a Best Supporting Actor nomination in the same year. Kill Bill: Volume 2 was placed in Empire Magazine's list of the "500 Greatest Films of All Time" at number 423 and the Bride was also ranked number 66 in Empire magazine's "100 Greatest Movie Characters".

Possible sequels 

In April 2004, Tarantino told Entertainment Weekly that he was planning a sequel:

At the 2006 San Diego Comic-Con International, Tarantino stated that, after the completion of Grindhouse, he wanted to make two anime Kill Bill films: an origin story about Bill and his mentors, and another origin starring the Bride. Details emerged around 2007 about two possible sequels, Kill Bill: Volume 3 and Volume 4. According to the article, "the third film involves the revenge of two killers whose arms and eye were hacked by Uma Thurman in the first stories." The article adds that the "fourth installment of the popular kung fu action films concerns a cycle of reprisals and daughters who avenge their mother's deaths". In 2020, Vivica A. Fox, who portrayed Vernita Green in the first film, suggested original actress Ambrosia Kelley would reprise her role as the grown up Nikki in the film, expressing interest in Zendaya being cast in the role if Kelley would be unable to return.
 
At the 2009 Morelia International Film Festival, Tarantino stated that he intended to make a third Kill Bill film. The same month, he stated that Kill Bill 3 would be his ninth film, and would be released in 2014. He said he wanted 10 years to pass after the Bride's last conflict, to give her and her daughter a period of peace.

In December 2012, Tarantino said there would "probably not" be a third film." However, in July 2019, Tarantino said that he and Thurman had talked again about a possible sequel, and added "If any of my movies were going to spring from my other movies, it would be a third Kill Bill." In December 2019, Tarantino said he had spoken to Thurman about an "interesting" idea for a new film: "It would be at least three years from now. It is definitely in the cards". In June 2021 Tarantino stated that the potential film would take place 20 years following the original volumes, and was excited about the possibility of Thurman and her daughter Maya Hawke playing the Bride and B.B. respectively. He also noted the possibility of Elle Driver, Sofie Fatale, and Gogo's twin sister Shiaki also appearing in the film. Later that month, Tarantino said that none of the potential sequels or prequels had come to fruition, due to his reluctance to take on more Kill Bill films following the fatigue he endured in the making of the first two volumes.

See also 
 Zoë Bell
 Lady Snowblood
 Kill Buljo
 Quentin Tarantino filmography

References

External links 

 
 
 
 

Kill Bill
2004 action thriller films
2000s feminist films
2004 films
2004 martial arts films
A Band Apart films
American action thriller films
American films about revenge
American martial arts films
American nonlinear narrative films
American sequel films
Films about secret societies
Films directed by Quentin Tarantino
Films produced by Lawrence Bender
Films scored by Robert Rodriguez
Films set in China
Films set in Los Angeles
Films set in Mexico
Films set in Texas
Films shot in Beijing
Films shot in California
Films shot in Los Angeles
Films shot in Mexico
Films with screenplays by Quentin Tarantino
Girls with guns films
Kung fu films
Miramax films
Samurai films
Miramax franchises
Films scored by RZA
2000s English-language films
2000s American films
2000s Japanese films